is a Prefectural Natural Park in central Mie Prefecture, Japan. Established in 1953, the park spans the municipalities of Matsusaka and Taki.

See also
 National Parks of Japan

References

Parks and gardens in Mie Prefecture
Protected areas established in 1953